David Faiumu (born 30 April 1983) is a former professional rugby league footballer who last played for the Huddersfield Giants in the Super League. A Samoa and New Zealand international representative forward, he previously played in the National Rugby League for the North Queensland Cowboys.

Background
Faiumu was born in Wellington, New Zealand.

Playing career
Faiumu played from the interchange bench in the North Queensland Cowboys' first ever Grand Final in 2005 which they lost to the Wests Tigers. Faiumu was selected to play for the New Zealand national team in the 2005 Tri-Nations Final 24–0 victory over Australia.
On 7 June 2008, it was announced that Faiumu had been granted a release from his contract with the Cowboys and was expected to sign with the Huddersfield Giants which he did.
 
He was named in the Samoa training squad for the 2008 Rugby League World Cup.

David Faiumu was selected for the Exiles squad for the Rugby League International Origin Match against England at Headingley Rugby Stadium, Leeds on 10 June 2011.

Faiumu left Huddersfield at the end of the 2014 season, retiring from the game and taking up a position as the Giant's Developmental Officer.

Club statistics

Representative statistics

References

External links
Huddersfield Giants profile
North Queensland Cowboys profile
NRL profile

1983 births
Living people
Exiles rugby league team players
Huddersfield Giants players
New Zealand rugby league players
New Zealand sportspeople of Samoan descent
New Zealand national rugby league team players
North Queensland Cowboys players
Rugby league hookers
Rugby league players from Wellington City
Samoa national rugby league team players
Wainuiomata Lions players
Wellington rugby league team players